Tuzlaköy can refer to:

 Tuzlaköy, Kulp
 Tuzlaköy, Lice
 Tuzlaköy, Oltu